Edwin Cooper (1 January 1785 – 1833) was an English artist, known for his work in painting animals. He was an honorary member of the Norwich Society, and is considered to be one of the Norwich School of painters.

Life

Edwin Cooper was born on 1 January 1785, the son of Daniel Cooper and his wife Martha Hockley, and was baptised at St. James' Church, Bury St. Edmunds. He studied under his father, a professional miniaturist who taught drawing at a school. During his career he exhibited nearly 100 works of art: 200 of his paintings were exhibited by the Norwich Society after his death.

References

Bibliography

External links

Works by Edwin Cooper in the Norfolk Museums Collections
Edwin Cooper - Suffolk Artists website
Works by Edwin W. Cooper at the Yale Center for British Art

19th-century English painters
English male painters
1806 births
1833 deaths
Artists from Bury St Edmunds
19th-century English male artists